Archachatina bicarinata, the Obô giant snail, or black snail,  is a species of air-breathing tropical land snail, a terrestrial pulmonate gastropod mollusk in the family Achatinidae.

Description
This giant shell is always sinistral or reverse-coiled (hence the synonym A. sinistrorsa).

Distribution
This species is endemic to São Tomé and Príncipe, off the west coast of Africa in the Gulf of Guinea.

Habitat
The Obô giant snail lives in the primary rainforest on the mountains. It suffers from habitat loss, the mass collection of the shells and harvesting the snails for food. The species got largely displaced by the smaller West African giant land snail (Archachatina marginata), which was introduced to the island in the 1980 and also brought diseases. A. bicarinata population has declined by more than 75% in the first 20 years of the 21st century. Formerly occurring throughout much of Principe, it is now only found in an area of some 46 km2 in the protected forests in the south of the island. Therefore the species is classified as endangered.

References

External links

Conchology.be
Archive
News.mongabay

Achatinidae
Endemic fauna of São Tomé and Príncipe
Invertebrates of São Tomé and Príncipe
Gastropods described in 1792
Taxonomy articles created by Polbot